Henry Donald Maurice Spence (Spence Jones from 1904; 14 January 1836 - 2 November 1917) was an Anglican dean and author in the last decades  of the 19th century and the start of the 20th.

The son of the barrister and Chancery reformer George Spence, he was born at Pall Mall, London and educated at Harvard University and Corpus Christi College, Cambridge, and ordained in 1865. He was a Lecturer in Hebrew at  St David's College, Lampeter until 1870 when he became  Rector of St Mary de Crypt, Gloucester. From 1877 to 1886 he was Rural Dean of St Pancras when he became Dean of Gloucester, a post he held until his death. As Dean, he banned performances of Edward Elgar's choral work The Dream of Gerontius from Gloucester Cathedral from 1900 until 1910 because of Roman Catholic references in its text. He adopted, additionally, the surname Jones (his wife's maiden name) in 1904. At some point he became a Doctor of Divinity (DD).

Works
Talmudical Commentary on Genesis, 1883
Cloister Life in Days of Cœur de Lion, 1892
The Church of England: a History for the People (4 vols), 1904
The Early Christians in Rome, 1910
"The Pulpit Commentary", 1909–1919

References

1836 births
People educated at Westminster School, London
Alumni of Corpus Christi College, Cambridge
Alumni of the University of Wales, Lampeter
Deans of Gloucester
1917 deaths